In marketing, art infusion is the general influence of artworks on perceptions and evaluations of products with which the artworks are associated.

The term was first introduced in an article in the Journal of Marketing Research in 2008, although Art Infusion was a gallery in South Yarra, Melbourne Australia, selling original art as homewares and furniture between 1994 and 2003. Henrik Hagtvedt and Vanessa Patrick, the two researchers who authored the article, demonstrated a favorable influence of artworks on consumer evaluations of non-art products that were associated with the artworks via, for instance, advertising or product design. The authors suggested that the creation and appreciation of art has evolved through the millennia of human prehistory, and that the universal human impulse to apply skill and creative effort to express oneself artistically is also reflected in the recognition of the objects thus created as belonging to a special category. This special category has several characteristics, including non-utility. This does not imply that artworks cannot have utility, but that creativity and skill are central to the creation and appreciation of the artwork, irrespective of any other functions, or lack thereof, that the artwork may serve. This non-utilitarian quest for excellence, when associated with other objects, leads to more favorable evaluations of those objects.

References
Corbett, Rachel (2008), “Striking Their Fancy,” ARTnews, 107 (6), 42.
Hagtvedt, Henrik and Vanessa M. Patrick (2008), “Art Infusion: The Influence of Visual Art on the Perception and Evaluation of Consumer Products,” Journal of Marketing Research, 45 (3), 379-389.
Helm, Burt (2008), “Impressionists Impress Better,” BusinessWeek, March 3, 20.
Science Daily (2008), “Simple Recipe For Ad Success: Just Add Art"
NY Arts Magazine (2008), “Visual Art Can Boost Advertising, Study Says”

Promotion and marketing communications
Visual arts